Little Blue Crunchy Things was an American music group from the Milwaukee, Wisconsin area, active from the late 1980s to 2000.

Little Blue Crunchy Things (LBCT) were formed in the late 1980s with vocalist Noah Tabakin joining in 1991, who became the de facto band leader. Noah often used audience participation and other events at concerts and shows to freestyle lyrical content.

The band's first album, Rhetoric, was released in 1994. The lineup at this time was Bill Backes on drums, Cara Davis on percussion/vocals, Rick Eels on bass, Douglas Haynes on saxophone, Brandon Mason on trumpet/trombone, Noah Tabakin on lead vocals/saxophone, and Michael Wengler on guitar. Independently produced, their first album's recording quality was mediocre, and the band would release new recorded versions of a few of songs on later albums.

Between the first and second albums, Eels, Mason, and Haynes left the band. Eels was replaced by Ken Fitzsimmons, and Haynes by Bryan Elliot, but LBCT was left without a trumpet/trombone player. The second album, Owner's Manual, is a recording of a live show at Shank Hall in Milwaukee in 1996. Davis, who was featured as a vocalist on only one song ("Brown Bear"), left the band shortly after Owner's Manual. Percussionist Jamie Ryan, and childhood friend of Ken Fitzsimmons, joined the group around this time.

The blues influence would return on the band's third album, Swarm. Compared to their first studio album, the recording and production of Swarm were of greater quality, and sales were also much higher than previous albums resulting in the band gaining national recognition. In 1999, they released their fourth album, Babies.

In early 2000, the band announced that they would be breaking up, and performed what was reportedly their last show that spring.  However, the band returned for what was billed as a reunion tour a few months later. This tour included Shank Hall and a performance at Summerfest. A show at the Barrymore Theater in Madison, Wisconsin on April 15, 2000 was recorded and released as their final album.

Since the breakup, the members have gone on to work on their own projects. Noah Tabakin's first group after LBCT was the short lived All Fours. He previously fronted TABAKIN, a funk, soul, hip-hop conglomeration and played saxophone in the 23 piece marching band Mucca Pazza. After leaving Wisconsin in 2000, Noah initially relocated to Chicago where he was involved in a number of projects. Tabakin is currently living in Los Angeles where he is performing as ssssnake. He also performs with Tour de Fat, and Fire Leopard with Jon Steinmeier where they perform as the house band at The Booby Trap Variety Show every Wednesday.  Ken Fitzsimmons currently fronts the Irish Rock band The Kissers, of which both Jamie Ryan and Bill Backes have been involved with. He is also the Education Director with the Madison Music Foundry, in Madison, Wisconsin. Bryan Elliot lives in Madison and previously played in the Latin band Prole, he has also played in The Bradachs and Smokin' With Superman, and is also a part of The Kissers with Ken Fitzsimmons. Bill Backes currently lives in Milwaukee and plays with The Lovelies and Testa Rosa. Michael Wengler is living in the New York area and Jamie Ryan currently lives in Illinois, where he is an associate professor at Eastern Illinois University. He continues to be involved in music with Africa -> West, a percussion trio who fuse African, Afro-Caribbean and Western music.

LBCT continues to perform reunion shows in Madison and Milwaukee.

Members
 Bill Backes - Drums
 Bryan Elliott - Saxophone
 Ken Fitzsimmons - Bass guitar
 Jamie Ryan - percussion
 Noah Tabakin - vocals/saxophone
 Michael Wengler - Guitar

Former members
 Cara Davis - percussion/vocals
 Paul Jonas - Bass guitar (1999/2000, after the temporary departure of Fitzsimmons following the 'Babies' sessions; performs on 2000s 'In Loving Memory Of...')
 Stephen Howard - Guitar (filled in for some reunion appearances)

Discography
 Rhetoric (1994)
 Owner's Manual (1996)
 Swarm (1997)
 Babies (1999)
 In Loving Memory Of... (album)'' (2000)

References

External links
 Little Blue Crunchy Things on MySpace 
 Little Blue Crunchy Things on Facebook https://www.facebook.com/littlebluecrunchythings

Rock music groups from Wisconsin